Zoran Vujčić (born 1 October 1961) is a Croatian retired footballer.

During his club career he played for Hajduk, Solin, Cibalia, Rijeka, Levante and Zadar.

External links
 
 

1961 births
Living people
People from Primorje-Gorski Kotar County
Association football forwards
Yugoslav footballers
Croatian footballers
HNK Hajduk Split players
NK Solin players
HNK Cibalia players
HNK Rijeka players
Levante UD footballers
NK Zadar players
Yugoslav First League players
Croatian Football League players
Segunda División players
First Football League (Croatia) players
Yugoslav expatriate footballers
Expatriate footballers in Spain
Yugoslav expatriate sportspeople in Spain